Antarctic Crossing is a 1958 British documentary film directed by George Lowe. It was nominated for an Academy Award for Best Documentary Feature. The film follows Sir Vivian Fuchs on his way back from Shackleton Base.

References

External links
 
 Watch Antarctic Crossing at NZ On Screen

1958 films
1958 documentary films
British documentary films
Documentary films about Antarctica
1950s English-language films
1950s British films